Year 1067 (MLXVII) was a common year starting on Monday (link will display the full calendar) of the Julian calendar.

Events 
 By place 

 Byzantine Empire 
 May 22 – Emperor Constantine X dies after a 7-year reign at Constantinople. His wife, Empress Eudocia Macrembolitissa, is crowned Augusta and becomes co-regent for her two sons (Michael VII and Konstantios) along with Constantine's brother John Doukas, who rules as Caesar of the Byzantine Empire.

 Seljuk Empire 
 Spring – The Seljuk Turks make incursions into Mesopotamia, Cilicia and Cappadocia. They sack the Byzantine city of Caesarea, move south through the Cilician Gates and raid the region around Antioch in Syria. 

 Europe 
 March 3 – Battle on the Nemiga River: The three sons of Grand Prince Yaroslav I (the Wise) – Iziaslav I, Sviatoslav II, and Vsevolod I – defeat the forces under Vseslav of Polotsk. 
 Eric and Eric, two pretenders to the Swedish throne, are both killed during the struggle for power in Sweden. Halsten, son of the late King Stenkil, becomes the new ruler.
 Olaf III returns to Norway with the remaining troops from the Battle of Stamford Bridge. He is proclaimed king and co-ruler with his older brother Magnus II (Haraldsson).
 Wartburg Castle (near Eisenach) is founded by Louis the Springer, count of Thuringia (modern Germany).
 Minsk and Orsha are first mentioned in the chronicles, making them two of the oldest cities in Belarus.

 England 
 Spring – King William I (the Conqueror) returns to Normandy and takes with him Edgar Ætheling (grandson of Edmund Ironside), Archbishop Stigand, and the brothers Morcar and Edwin.
 Odo of Bayeux, a half-brother of William I, is appointed Earl of Kent and becomes William's deputy (or de facto regent) in England. His wealth and land become considerable.
 Eustace II, count of Boulogne, supports the Kentishmen in an attempt to seize Dover Castle. The conspiracy fails, and Eustace is sentence to forfeit his English fiefs.
 Winter – William I marches on Exeter, which he besieges. The city holds out for 18 days, and after its fall William builds a castle to secure the region.
 Winchester Castle in Hampshire is founded by William I; it is later one of the seats of government of the Norman kings ruling England.

 China 
 January 25 – Emperor Ying Zong (or Zhao Shu) of the Song Dynasty dies after a 4-year reign. He is succeeded by his 18-year-old son Shen Zong as emperor of China.

 By topic 

 Religion  
 December 6 – A fire, the second in as many years, heavily damages Canterbury Cathedral.

Births 
 Abu Hafs Umar an-Nasafi, Persian scholar and historian (d. 1142)
 Adela of Normandy, countess of Blois (approximate date)
 Ari Thorgilsson, Icelandic chronicler and writer (d. 1148)
 John Taronites, Byzantine governor (approximate date)

Deaths 
 January 25 – Ying Zong, Chinese emperor (b. 1032)
 February 13 – Geoffrey II, French nobleman
 April 17 – Robert de Turlande, French priest
 May 22 – Constantine X, Byzantine emperor (b. 1006)
 July 12 – John Komnenos, Byzantine general 
 September 1 – Baldwin V, count of Flanders 
 November 27 – Sancha of León, queen of León
 December 2 – Shaykh Tusi, Persian Shia scholar (b. 995)
 Aedh Ua Con Ceanainn, king of Uí Díarmata
 Bahmanyār, Persian philosopher and logician
 Cai Xiang, Chinese calligrapher and poet (b. 1012)
 Elisaveta Yaroslavna of Kiev, Norwegian queen
 Eric and Eric, Swedish throne pretenders 
 Gervais de Château-du-Loir, French nobleman (b. 1007)
 Muireadhach Ua Cárthaigh, Irish chief poet
 Richard, French nobleman (House of Normandy)
 Wulfwig (or Wulfinus), bishop of Dorchester

References